Ancylolomia shefferialis is a moth in the family Crambidae. It was described by Rougeot in 1984. It is found in Ethiopia.

References

Ancylolomia
Moths described in 1984
Moths of Africa